Shanghai Street Circuit is a street circuit in Pudong, Shanghai. On 18 July 2004, the  track hosted a non-championship race of Deutsche Tourenwagen Masters won by Gary Paffett for Mercedes-AMG.

On 28 January 2010, DTM bosses revealed the final calendar for the 2010 Deutsche Tourenwagen Masters season featured a season finale on a shortened  version of the street circuit on 31 October 2010 for the first time in six years. The race was later rescheduled for 28 November 2010, and was won by Gary Paffett, while his teammate at HWA Team Paul di Resta claimed the drivers' title there.

References

External links
Track map 2004
AutoRacing1 Exclusive - Is Shanghai in CART's future

Motorsport venues in Shanghai
Sports venues in Shanghai
Streets in Shanghai